The 2008 European Open Water Swimming Championships was the 11th edition of the European Open Water Swimming Championships (but the 4th stand alone after 1989, 1991 and 1993 editions) and took part from 8–14 September 2008 in Dubrovnik, Croatia.

Results

Men

Women

Mixed

Medal table

See also
 2008 European Aquatics Championships
 List of medalists at the European Open Water Swimming Championships

References

External links
 Ligue Européenne de Natation LEN Official Website

European Open Water Swimming Championships
European Open Water Championships